Shift-by-wire is the system on an automatic transmission in which the transmission modes are engaged/changed in an automobile through electronic controls without any mechanical linkage between the gear shifting lever and the transmission. The transmission shifting was traditionally accomplished by mechanical links through a lever mounted on the steering column or a gear shifter near the center console. 

This eliminates routing space required for housing the mechanical linkages between the shifter and the transmission and provides effortless shifting through the press of a button or through knobs. The elimination of this linkage removes any shift effort from the driver’s gear selection.

Safety recalls related to shift-by-wire systems 
There have been safety issues identified with production vehicles implementing the shift by wire systems which have led to recalls. The major hazards associated with this type of systems are vehicle not achieving park state and vehicle moving in the wrong direction (drive vs reverse).

See also 
Drive by wire
Park by wire

References 

Automotive electronics
Vehicle safety technologies
Automotive transmission technologies